Digimon Adventure is an anime series produced by Toei Animation. It began broadcasting in Japan on Fuji Television on March 7, 1999, and ended on March 26, 2000. The series was directed by Hiroyuki Kakudō and produced by Keisuke Okuda, featuring music composition by Takanori Arisawa and character designs by Katsuyoshi Nakatsuru. The story revolves around a group of elementary school students known as the DigiDestined, who are transported to a parallel Digital World and find themselves in a quest to save it from evil forces with the help of their partner creatures. The series was followed in 2000 with a sequel titled Digimon Adventure 02.

Digimon Adventure was broadcast with English dubbing under the title Digimon: Digital Monsters in the United States on Fox Kids and in Canada on YTV. The series premiered on August 14, 1999, in the United States. Overall licensing of English-language material of the series was managed by Saban Entertainment, which was eventually acquired by The Walt Disney Company. Digimon Adventure has been compiled into DVD box sets by Bandai Visual and Happinet in Japan and by Cinedigm in North America. On August 1, 2013, the show became available for streaming in both its English and Japanese versions on Netflix in North America.

Two pieces of theme music were used in the original version of the series. Kōji Wada's song "Butter-Fly" was used as the opening theme for the series, and Ai Maeda's (credited as AiM) songs "I wish" and "Keep on" were used as ending themes. The English opening featured an original composition by Paul Gordon.

Digimon Adventure was licensed by Saban Entertainment in North America under the name Digimon: Digital Monsters. The show initially aired on Fox Kids Network and Fox Family Channel before distribution rights were sold to Disney through BVS and ABC Family Worldwide, later airing on Toon Disney from the teenage block Jetix and the rebranded ABC Family.


Episode list

Volume DVDs

Japanese release 
Digimon Adventure was released as a 9-disc DVD boxed set by Bandai Visual on July 25, 2006, with each disc containing six episodes. Happinet also released its own 9-disc set on December 21, 2007. And an 8-Disc Standard Definition Upscaled Blu-ray set, in March 2015. Each disc contained 7 episodes. Also comes with a limited edition drama CD, and art booklet.

North American release 
The first 13 episodes were released in 1999 & 2000 by Fox Kids Video under license by 20th Century Fox Home Entertainment. The entire first season was released on October 9, 2012 by New Video. An "English Language Version" Blu-ray set featuring the dub was released on December 27, 2022 by Discotek Media  with an "Original Japanese Version" to be released at a later date.
 Digimon: Digital Monsters, Volume 1 (Episodes 1–21)
 Digimon: Digital Monsters, Volume 2 (Episodes 22–39) 
 Digimon: Digital Monsters, Volume 3 (Episodes 40–54)

United Kingdom release 
The first 20 episodes were released on four DVD sets by Maximum Entertainment between 2004–2008. The entire first season was released as one set on October 3, 2016 by Manga Entertainment.

 Digimon: Digital Monsters – Volume 1 (2004)
 Digimon: Digital Monsters – Volume 2 (2006)
 Digimon: Digital Monsters Collection (2007) 
 Digimon: Digital Monsters – Subzero Ice Punch (2008)
 Digimon: Digital Monsters – Complete Season 1 (2016)

Australian release 
Collection 1, containing 27 episodes was released on the August 17 in Australia by Madman Entertainment. Collection 2, was released on 11 October containing the remaining 27 episodes of the season.

See also 

 Digimon
 List of Digimon Adventure 02 episodes

Notes

References

External links 
 Digimon Adventure official website 
 

Digimon Adventure
1999 Japanese television seasons
2000 Japanese television seasons
Adventure